Julian Reister (born 2 April 1986) is a German retired professional tennis player. His career-high singles ranking is world No. 83, achieved in November 2013. Reister reached the quarterfinals of Buenos Aires in 2013 as a qualifier.

Career

2006
Reister qualified for his first ATP World Tour tournament at Basel where he lost in the first round to Guillermo García-López 6–7(4), 2–6.

2007
Reister entered Basel as a qualifier where he lost in the first round to Roko Karanušić 0–6, 3–6.

2010
Reister qualified into the main draw at Brisbane where he lost in the first round to Florent Serra 7–6(3), 6–7(5), 5–7. 

Reister next qualified into the main draw at the French Open. He defeated 27th seed Feliciano López in the first round 6–1, 7–6(5), 6–2 to record his first ever ATP World Tour victory. He went on to defeat Olivier Rochus in the second round 6–2, 6–2, 7–6(5) before losing to Roger Federer in straight sets 4–6, 0–6, 4–6.

Reister next made it into the main draw of the 2010 Wimbledon Championships as a lucky loser. He advanced to the 2nd round by defeating qualifier Rik de Voest 6–4, 7–5, 3–6, 6–2. He then lost to Xavier Malisse 7–6(7), 4–6, 1–6, 4–6

Reister was given a wildcard into the ATP 500 2010 International German Open. In the first round he defeated fellow wild card Daniel Brands 6–2, 7–6(10). He then caused an upset in the second round defeating 12th seed Victor Hănescu 7–6(4), 6–4 before losing a close match to Denis Istomin in the third round 6–3, 3–6, 6–7(3).

2011
Reister won his first challenger title in Monza defeating Alessio Di Mauro in the final. He qualified for the 2011 BMW Open where he won his opening match over countryman Daniel Brands before losing to Nikolay Davydenko in a close match.

2013
Reister became only the second man in the history of professional tennis to record a golden set (first had been Bill Scanlon in 1983, Stefano Napolitano joined them in 2015). In the first round of qualifying at the 2013 US Open, he defeated compatriot Tim Puetz 6–7(3), 6–4, 6–0. This is also the only match ever recorded with a golden set that lasted more than two sets.

ATP Challenger and ITF Futures finals

Singles: 22 (6–16)

Doubles: 8 (5–3)

Singles performance timeline 

1 Including Win–loss 2006 (0–1), 2007 (0–1)

External links
 
 

German male tennis players
1986 births
Living people
Tennis players from Hamburg